Tyrese is the debut studio album by American singer Tyrese. It was released on September 29, 1998 through  RCA Records in the United States. The production on the album was handled by multiple producers including Ron "Amen-Ra" Lawrence, Tricky Stewart, The Characters, Derek Allen and Anthony Morgan among others. 

Tyrese was supported by three singles: "Nobody Else", "Sweet Lady" and "Lately". The album received generally positive reviews from music critics and was a commercial success.

Background
Tyrese starred in a 1994 Coca-Cola commercial titled "Always Cool (Always Coca-Cola)," where he was shown singing. This commercial captured the attention of RCA Records, who signed the singer to the label.

Singles
"Nobody Else", was released as the album's lead single on August 4, 1998. The single peaked at number 36 on the Billboard Hot 100 chart dated September 19, 1998, becoming Tyrese's first US top 40 song. The album's second single, "Sweet Lady" was released on November 10, 1998. The second single peaked at number 12 on the chart dated May 1, 1999, becoming Tyrese's first highest peaking song at the time and the album's most successful single. The album's third single, "Lately" was released on March 23, 1999. The third single peaked at number 56 on the chart dated July 3, 1999.

Commercial performance
Tyrese debuted at number 189 on the US Billboard 200 chart, on the chart week dated November 14, 1998. After its tenth week on the chart, the album reached it peak at number 17 on the chart. The album also spent a total of 36 weeks on the chart. On March 13, 1999, the album was certified platinum by the Recording Industry Association of America (RIAA) for sales of over a million copies in the United States.

Track listing

Personnel
Credits for Tyrese adapted from Allmusic.

Paul D. Allen - drums
Karen Anderson - background vocals
Ben Arrindell - engineer, mixing
Terry Bradford - background vocals
Stephanie Cooke - background vocals
Kevin "KD" Davis - mixing
Tony Dawsey - mastering
Ken Deranteriasian - engineer
Tony Duran - photography
Chad Elliott - composer
Kevin Evans - executive producer
Peter Gunz - performer
Fundisha Johnson - background vocals
Brett Kilroe - art direction
Ron "Amen-Ra" Lawrence - producer
Ken Lewis - engineer
Nate Love - multiple instruments, producer
Steve MacMillan - engineer
Marc Nelson - background vocals

Ron Otis - drums
Troy Patterson - engineer
Valerie Pinkston - background vocals
Michael J. Powell - guitar, percussion, producer, mixing
Mike Rew - engineer
Paul Riser - strings
Leland Robinson - producer
Thom Russo - engineer
Gerard Smerek - engineer, mixing
Chris "Tricky" Stewart - producer, engineer
Kevin Thomas - engineer
Al West - producer
Jonathan Williams - engineer
Johnta Austin - composer, background vocals
Troy Taylor - producer, composer
J.C. Whitelaw - guitar 
Lawson A. Turner - bass 
Paul Allen - drums

Charts

Weekly charts

Year-end charts

Certifications

References

External links
[ Tyrese] at Allmusic
 https://www.youtube.com/watch?v=-uRRa2ewNGk&t=305s

1998 debut albums
Albums with cover art by Tony Duran
Tyrese Gibson albums
RCA Records albums
Albums produced by Michael J. Powell